Two of the main battles of the Bar Confederation took place on the plains before Lanckorona, a small settlement 27km (17 mi) southwest of the Polish capital Kraków.

First Battle 
On 22 February 1769, the Bar Confederates defended Lanckorona and its Castle from the Russian army led by Alexander Suvorov. The Russians were forced to retreat after a surprising victory for the significantly outnumbered Polish army.

Second Battle 
The second battle before the mount of Lanckorona, and one of the greatest clashes of Polish and Russian forces during the Bar Confederation, took place on 23 May 1771. A Polish formation of 1,300 men including French and European volunteers with 18 cannons was suddenly attacked by 4,000 Russians commanded again by general Alexander Suvorov. 

The Russian forces executed a surprise attack in the early hours of the morning. The new commander on the Polish side, French envoy lieutenant-colonel Charles François Dumouriez was caught off guard and was unable to assemble his men. The battle was thus a decisive victory for the Russians.

Aftermath 
Many historians argue that the defeat at Lanckorona was sabotage on the part of Dumouriez as he was privately outspoken against the Polish nation and its Roman Catholic aspirations. Dumouriez was noted as calling Poland an "Asiatic nation" and relying on his French and European volunteers which lost the battle instead of "Asiats". This interpretation is lent weight by Dumouriez's later betrayal of Tadeusz Kościuszko when he passed on the plans for the Kościuszko Uprising to Prussia in 1793. Antoine-Charles du Houx and Baron de Vioménil replaced Dumouriez in the Bar Confederation army.

References

Conflicts in 1771
1771 in Europe
Lanckorona
Lanckorona
Bar Confederation
Alexander Suvorov